Hargin is a surname. Notable people with the surname include:

Janette Hargin (born 1977), Swedish alpine skier
Mattias Hargin (born 1985), Swedish alpine skier

See also
Harkin